Jon Platt is an American music-publishing executive and a former DJ. He is Chairman and CEO of Sony Music Publishing after having spent 17 years at EMI Music Publishing.

Early life
Although he was born in Philadelphia, Platt considers Denver his hometown; his childhood bounced him from Park Hill to Aurora before he landed firmly in Montbello, where he grew up from the time he was in the fifth grade. He and several siblings were raised there by his mother, who worked security at Rocky Flats to support her family.

Career

DJ
While working at a Dave Cook sporting goods store in Aurora, Platt met a friend who taught him DJing. From 1985 to 1989, he DJed at Norman's Place, building an audience for himself through word of mouth. He then founded his own party event at a ballroom in a Quality Inn, which was profitable. However, a murder took place at Platt's 26th birthday party in 1990, and the negative press that followed brought that run to an end. A friend convinced him to rebuild, and he successfully got a following going again, drawing patrons to the club Maximilian's.

Management
Platt credits a conversation in Denver with Public Enemy's front man, Chuck D, as main inspiration for wanting to be more than a local DJ. He decided to become a manager and relocated to Los Angeles where he was introduced to Madukey Productions by a friend. He secured the crew a remix to 2Pac's single "Keep Ya Head Up" and brokered a publishing deal with EMI for both Madukey and producer Kiyamma Griffin, thereby establishing a relationship with Steve Prudhomme, a creative manager at EMI.

Publishing
In 1995, Prudhomme left EMI to join Warner Bros. and he recommended his former employer to hire Platt as the creative manager. It didn't take long until he made noise by acquiring the publishing rights to TLC's single "Waterfalls," one of the biggest crossover hits of the mid '90s. He quickly climbed the corporate ladder becoming the creative-director after a year and vice president a year later. He also successfully recruited Jay-Z to EMI after the release of his classic debut-album, Reasonable Doubt, in '96.

In 2012, Platt left his position as vice president at EMI for Warner/Chappell Music where he was named President.

In 2015, Platt was named CEO of Warner Chappell Music.

In 2019, Platt joined Sony/ATV Music Publishing as Chairman and CEO.

References

American music industry executives
Living people
Businesspeople from Philadelphia
1964 births